Kaupanger is a village situated along the northern shore of the Sognefjorden in the municipality of Sogndal in Vestland county, Norway. Kaupanger IL is a sports club located in Kaupanger.

History
Kaupanger originated as a settlement during the Viking Age. Earlier, Kaupanger was known as Tingstad. Kaupang is an Old Norse term for a trading or market place so the village's name is composed of kaup- (buy) and angr (fjord, harbor), hence "buy harbor", similar to the literal translation of Copenhagen.  The Kaupanger Stave Church is believed to have been built in the 12th century and it is still in existence in this village.

References

Villages in Vestland
Sogndal